Saptagram (colloquially called Satgaon) was a major port, the chief city and sometimes capital of southern Bengal, in ancient and medieval times, the location presently being in the Hooghly district in the Indian state of West Bengal. It is about 4 km from Bandel, a major rail junction. By the early twentieth century, the place had dwindled to a group of insignificant huts. The port had to be abandoned because of the silting up and consequent drying of the Saraswati River.

Etymology
The word Saptagram means seven villages. These are identified as Bansberia, Kristapur, Basudebpur, Nityanandapur, Sibpur, Sambachora and Baladghati.

History

According to Binoy Ghosh, Tamralipta, the ancient port, started declining from the 8th century, owing to river silting, and Saptagram possibly started gaining in importance as a port from the 9-10th century. Saptagram port, along with its business centre, had become important in the pre-Muslim era, during the rule of the Palas and Senas. In the Muslim era, Saptagram was an important administrative centre right from the beginning, and the period 14th to 16th century was considered the golden age of Saptagram. In 1565 Maharaja Rudranarayan of Bhurshut conquered it from pathans . In 1592 AD Saptogram was captured and looted by the Pathans. In the 17th century, Hooghly-Bandel-Chinsurah started gaining in importance. From the 18th century, Kolkata started emerging as the main business and cultural centre of Bengal.

See also
 European colonies in India
 Saptagram (Vidhan Sabha constituency)

References

External links
  Wikimapia satellite view of Iswar Gupta Setu and surrounding areas

Ancient divisions in Bengal
Hooghly district
Cities and towns in Hooghly district
Neighbourhoods in Kolkata
Kolkata Metropolitan Area